Sole Common Pond is a   nature reserve  south-west of Boxford in Berkshire in Berkshire. It is managed by the Berkshire, Buckinghamshire and Oxfordshire Wildlife Trust.

It consists of a Sphagnum fringed pond, heath, wet woodland and a wildflower meadow.

Fauna

The site has the following fauna:

Invertebrates

Sympetrum danae
Conocephalus fuscus
Metrioptera roeselii
Southern hawker
Common darter
Lestes sponsa
Four-spotted chaser
Large red damselfly
Keeled skimmer

Birds

Eurasian woodcock
Wood warbler

Flora

The site has the following flora:

Trees

Birch

Plants

Menyanthes trifoliata
Polypodium vulgare
Erica tetralix
Calluna vulgaris
Drosera rotundifolia
Hypericum perforatum
Sphagnum magellanicum
Sphagnum capillifolium
Sphagnum inundatum

Fungi

Cantharellus cibarius
Caloboletus calopus
Russula nobilis

References

Berkshire, Buckinghamshire and Oxfordshire Wildlife Trust
Welford, Berkshire